Wildcat is the name of several fictional characters, all DC Comics superheroes, the first and most famous being Theodore "Ted" Grant, a long-time member of the Justice Society of America (JSA). A world-class heavyweight boxer, Grant became entangled inadvertently in the criminal underworld and developed a costumed identity to clear his name.

Other characters have taken Grant's name and identity, including his goddaughter Yolanda Montez, who served as a temporary replacement for him, and his son Thomas "Tom" Bronson, a metahuman werecat who is tutored by him as a second Wildcat and a JSA member in late-2000s stories.

Ted Grant has made several appearances in DC media, such as the third season of Arrow, in which he was portrayed by J.R. Ramirez, and the DC Universe streaming service show Stargirl, portrayed by Brian Stapf. Additionally, Yolanda Montez also appears in Stargirl, portrayed by Yvette Monreal.

Fictional character biography

Theodore "Ted" Grant

The Ted Grant version of Wildcat first appeared in Sensation Comics #1 and was created by writer Bill Finger, and designed by illustrator Irwin Hasen.

Yolanda Montez

Born with metahuman powers due to the machinations of the villainous Doctor Benjamin Love, Yolanda Montez was the goddaughter of Ted Grant, who was a good friend of her father "Mauler" Montez. As a result of the prenatal treatments given to her mother, Yolanda was born with retractable claws on her fingers and toes and cat-like agility. Initially, she concealed her abilities and lived a normal life. She later became a journalist working for "Rock Stars Magazine". When Ted was injured in the Crisis, Yolanda used her powers to become the new Wildcat. She then joined Infinity Inc. afterwards. She and her Infinity Inc. teammate Beth Chapel were later killed by Eclipso, who would later possess her cousin Alex.

Hector Ramirez
Hector Ramirez first appeared in Batman/Wildcat # 1 (April 1997) and was created by Chuck Dixon, Beau Smith, and Sergio Cariello. He was a boxing protégé of Ted Grant. After learning that Ted used to be Wildcat, Hector aspired to be his successor, something Ted refused. Hector then took one of Ted's old costumes and went out as Wildcat in Gotham City. In an attempt to break up a secret fight club where caged villains fought to the death, Ramirez was himself caught and later killed by Killer Croc in the ring. The operators Lock-Up and Ernie Chubb were eventually apprehended by Ted and Batman.

Tom Bronson

Thomas "Tom" Bronson is Ted Grant's youngest son. Tom's mother Marilyn had a one-night stand with Ted, and never told him of Tom's existence. Despite the fact that his father was not involved in his life, Tom is not bitter towards Ted. However, he did tell Ted that he had no intentions of becoming the next Wildcat, as he was not a fighter himself.

It was revealed that Tom is a metahuman that can change into a were-panther at will, similar to the Wildcat featured in Kingdom Come. When Ted was attacked by Vandal Savage, Tom changed into his were-panther form and managed to fight against Savage until help arrived.
 
In Justice Society of America 80 Page Giant Sized (2010), it was revealed that Tom's mother had the same powers as her son, but would change involuntarily every month. After a minor battle involving Ted, Marilyn, and the first Huntress, Ted took Marilyn to see Doctor Mid-Nite, who cured her of the involuntary aspect of her power, allowing her to change at will instead. While she is unconscious, Ted told Doctor Mid-Nite to "fix her and send her on her way" to protect her from his dangerous walk of life. Doctor Mid-Nite discovered that she was pregnant and revealed this to his now-conscious patient. She ultimately decided to withhold this information from Ted, but her motivations were unclear. She then raised Tom herself.

Over time, Tom slowly forms a bond with Ted and eventually, after some initial reluctance, agrees to share the Wildcat name with his father. At this point, he is introduced and inducted into the Justice Society.

In a team-up with the Justice League, he talks to Vixen and indicates the presence of enhanced senses.

Later, Tom, now calling himself Tomcat, parted ways with Ted and joined the All-Stars, an offshoot team created by the younger members of the JSA.

Other versions

Tangent Comics
In Tangent: Superman's Reign #3, the Wildcat of Earth-9 is revealed to be a large, humanoid, cat creature, a member of the Nightwing organization's Covert Ops team.

In other media

Television

Live-action
 Ted Grant makes a cameo appearance in the Smallville two-part episode "Absolute Justice", portrayed by Roger Hasket.
 Ted Grant appeared as a recurring character in the third season of Arrow, portrayed by J.R. Ramirez.
 Both the Ted Grant and Yolanda Montez incarnations of Wildcat appear in Stargirl, portrayed by Brian Stapf and Yvette Monreal respectively. As Wildcat, Grant and Montez wear an exo-suit capable of enhancing the wearer's natural athleticism, adjust to any size, possesses retractable claws that can pierce metal, and grant precise balance. Additionally, Montez takes up the mantle after Grant fell in battle against the Injustice Society ten years prior.

Animation
 A character based on Ted Grant / Wildcat called Catman appears in the Justice League two-part episode "Legends", voiced by Stephen Root. The Catman, real name T. Blake (not to be confused with Thomas Blake / Catman), was an athletic superhero armed with a grappling hook and retractable claws, a skilled martial artist, and member of the Justice Guild of America in the 1950s from an alternate universe. He fought crime alongside his teammates until they were killed in a nuclear war. After accidentally sending themselves to the Justice Guild's universe, the Justice League encounter a projection of Catman and his team created by a mutated child named Ray Thompson.

 The Ted Grant incarnation of Wildcat appears in Justice League Unlimited, voiced by Dennis Farina.
 The Ted Grant incarnation of Wildcat appears in Batman: The Brave and the Bold, voiced by R. Lee Ermey.
 The Ted Grant incarnation of Wildcat makes a cameo appearance in the Young Justice episode "Humanity".
 The Ted Grant incarnation of Wildcat appears in DC Super Hero Girls, voiced by John DiMaggio.

Film
 The Ted Grant incarnation of Wildcat appears in Justice League: The New Frontier.
 An evil version of Wildcat from Earth-Three appears in Justice League: Crisis on Two Earths as one of the Crime Syndicate's Made-Men.
 The Ted Grant incarnation of Wildcat makes a cameo appearance in Teen Titans Go! To the Movies.

Video games
 The Ted Grant incarnation of Wildcat appears in Batman: The Brave and the Bold – The Videogame, voiced again by R. Lee Ermey.
 The Ted Grant incarnation of Wildcat appears in DC Universe Online, voiced by Ken Webster.

Toys
 The Ted Grant incarnation of Wildcat was the first figure released in the ninth wave of the DC Universe Classics line and was available in his black and blue costumes.
 In 2020, Fisher-Price released a 2.5 inch Wildcat figure as part of their Imaginext DC Super Friends series.

Parodies
The Ted Grant incarnation of Wildcat makes a cameo appearance in the Robot Chicken DC Comics Special, voiced by Matthew Senreich.

Reception
IGN listed Ted Grant as Wildcat as the 71st greatest comic book character of all time stating that, due to his age as a superhero, he is almost more mystifying than the Spectre.

References

External links
 JSA Fact File: Wildcat I
 Earth-2 Wildcat Index
 Comic Book Profile: Earth-1 Wildcat (Ted Grant)

All-American Publications characters
Characters created by Alex Ross
Characters created by Bill Finger
Characters created by Chuck Dixon
Characters created by Geoff Johns
Comics characters introduced in 1942
Comics characters introduced in 1997
Comics characters introduced in 2006
DC Comics male superheroes
DC Comics martial artists
DC Comics metahumans
DC Comics orphans
Earth-Two
Fictional boxers
Fictional Krav Maga practitioners
Fictional werecats
Golden Age superheroes